The Men's 470 Class Competition at the 1992 Summer Olympics was held from 27 July to 4 August 1992 in Barcelona, Spain. Points were awarded for placement in each race. The best six out of seven race scores did count for the final placement.

Results

Daily standings

Notes

References 
 
 
 
 
 

 

470 Men's
470 competitions
Men's events at the 1992 Summer Olympics